Juan Antonio Prieto is a paralympic athlete from Spain competing mainly in category T12 sprints events.

Biography
Prieto has competed at three paralympics and won medals at all three.  His first games were in 1992 in his home country where he competed in the 200m, 400m, high jump and triple jump he won a silver in the pentathlon and was part of both the 4 × 100 m and 4 × 400 m relay teams that won gold medals for Spain.

In the 1996 Summer Paralympics he won silver in the 200m and won gold in the 100m and was part of the Spanish relay teams that defended both the 4 × 100 m and 4 × 400 m gold medals.  In his third Paralympics in 2000 he competed in the 100m and 200m and was part of the Spanish team that won bronze in the 4 × 100 m.

References

Paralympic athletes of Spain
Athletes (track and field) at the 1992 Summer Paralympics
Athletes (track and field) at the 1996 Summer Paralympics
Athletes (track and field) at the 2000 Summer Paralympics
Paralympic gold medalists for Spain
Paralympic silver medalists for Spain
Paralympic bronze medalists for Spain
Living people
Medalists at the 1992 Summer Paralympics
Medalists at the 1996 Summer Paralympics
Medalists at the 2000 Summer Paralympics
Year of birth missing (living people)
Paralympic medalists in athletics (track and field)
Spanish male sprinters
Visually impaired sprinters
Paralympic sprinters